Kristina Petrushina, better known as Keyyo, (born 27 February 1997) is a Russian born Swedish comedian and television presenter. She was born in Omsk, Russia and moved to Sweden at the age of nine, residing in Smedjebacken. In 2014, Keyyo got her own comedy show on SVT Play called Keyyo & Co, the script to the show was written by herself and Sissela Benn.
In 2015, Keyyo again had her own show on SVT Play where she tried on different summer jobs, called Ombytta roller med Keyyo.

Keyyo had the role of "Irina" in the SVT series Må underbart med Tiffany Persson, in 2016 with Anders Jansson playing the lead role.

In 2018, Keyyo and Carina Berg presented the gala Barncancergalan – Det svenska humorpriset. The same year she was a contestant on Fort Boyard on TV4.

Keyyo presented Talang in 2017 and 2018 which was broadcast on TV4 along with Pär Lernström. Since 2017, Keyyo presents Morgonpasset on Sveriges Radio. 

In 2019, Keyyo along with Johan Rheborg travelled to Russia, which resulted in the travel show ”Keyyo med Rheborg i Ryssland”, which was broadcast on SVT.

References

External links 

Swedish television personalities
Living people
1997 births
Swedish comedians